Varicospira kooli is a species of sea snail, a marine gastropod mollusk in the family Rostellariidae, the true conchs.

Description

Distribution
This marine species occurs off Thailand and Myanmar.

References

External links

Rostellariidae
Gastropods described in 2007